Crossodactylodes bokermanni (common names: Bokermann's bromeliad frog, Bokermann's stream froglet) is a species of frog in the family Leptodactylidae. It is endemic to Espírito Santo state of eastern Brazil. While its range is small, it is locally abundant.
It is an arboreal species living in forests near  altitude. It is associated with epiphytic bromeliads where its tadpoles develop. It is threatened by habitat loss.

References

Crossodactylodes
Endemic fauna of Brazil
Amphibians of Brazil
Taxonomy articles created by Polbot
Amphibians described in 1983